Many bilateral treaties were signed by the Hawaiian Kingdom.

Under Kamehameha III
 United States of America, December 23, 1826 (Treaty)
 United Kingdom, November 13, 1836 (Lord E. Russell's Treaty)
 France, July 17, 1839 (Captain LaPlace's Convention)
 France, March 26, 1846 (Treaty)
 United Kingdom, March 26, 1846 (Treaty)
 Denmark, October 19, 1846 (Treaty)
 Hamburg, January 8, 1848 (Treaty)
 Agreement Touching Consular Notices (Danish and Hamburg Treaties), January 25, 1848
 United States of America, December 20, 1849 (Treaty of Friendship, Commerce and Navigation)
 Sweden and Norway, July 1, 1852 (Treaty)
 Tahiti, November 24, 1853
 Bremen, March 27, 1854 (Treaty)

Under Kamehameha IV
 France, September 8, 1858 (Treaty)
 Belgium, October 4, 1862 (Treaty)
 Netherlands, October 16, 1862 (Treaty)
 Italy, July 22, 1863 (Treaty)
 Spain, October 9, 1863 (Treaty)

Under Kamehameha V
 Swiss Confederation, July 20, 1864 (Treaty)
 Russia, June 19, 1869 (Treaty)
 Japan, August 17, 1871 (Treaty)

Under Kalākaua
 New South Wales, March 10, 1874 (Postal Convention)
 United States of America, January 30, 1875 (Reciprocity Treaty)
 German Empire, 1879–80 (Treaty)
 Portugal, May 5, 1882 (Provisional Convention)
 United States of America, December 6, 1884 (Supplementary Convention)
 Hong Kong, December 13, 1884 (Money Order Regulations)
 Universal Postal Union, March 21, 1885 (Additional Act of Lisbon)
 Japan, January 28, 1886 (Convention)
 Universal Postal Union, November 9, 1886 (Ratification)
 Samoa, March 20, 1887 (Treaty)

See also
 Hawaiian Kingdom
 Hawaiian Kingdom–United States relations
 Hawaii–Tahiti relations

References 

History of the foreign relations of the United States
Treaties of the Hawaiian Kingdom
bilateral treaties